The Santa Cruz Youth Union (Unión Juvenil Cruceñista) (UJC) is a far-right movement based in Santa Cruz, Bolivia. Founded in 1957 as an arm of the Pro Santa Cruz Committee (Comite Pro Santa Cruz), the UJC has recently become the subject of controversy and accusation concerning its activities in support of the Santa Cruz autonomy movement in opposition to the government of Evo Morales and his MAS political party.

History

The organization was founded in 1957 by Carlos Valverde Barbery, leader of the Bolivian Socialist Falange, a falangist party. According to its founder, "the Union of Crucenist Youth was created to be the "armed arm" of the Pro-Santa Cruz Committee, taking charge not only of the street struggle but also of popular indoctrination and military support to the committee. » In 1971, it took part in Hugo Banzer's coup d'état. Carlos Valverde Barbery was appointed Minister of Health.

Claiming a membership of more than two thousand, the UJC has violently enforced general civic strikes called for by the Pro Santa Cruz Committee, intimidated and assaulted leftist political opponents, and provided security for the 4 May Santa Cruz Autonomy referendum, participating in violent clashes the day of the vote. Two members of the UJC were arrested and accused of plotting to assassinate Morales on 20 June 2008, when encountered by police in possession of a rifle, scope, and ammunition in Santa Cruz prior to the president's flight arrival. Some sources claimed that they were captured at the airport, but others located the suspects in a popular market. Nevertheless, the prosecutor dismissed the case and they were both released shortly afterwards.

Ideology and characteristics

Being a Falangist is still a condition for joining the Union of Crucenist Youth. Known for its violent activism, the organization is considered a paramilitary group by the International Federation for Human Rights (FIDH). Its activists are generally from the bourgeoisie.

References

External links
 Operatoria y lenguaje de la UJC
 La ujc trato de voicotear concentración de sectores sociales
 Unión cruceñista golpea a campesinos
 Periodista salva indígena apaleado x juventud cruceñista
 SEPARATISTAS agreden policía BOLIVIA SANTA CRUZ 4 MAYO DE 2008
 Nación camba, discriminación a Bolivianos, 4 de mayo de 2008
 Bolivia Santa Cruz Violencia por parte de Unión Junevil
 Cruceños de barrios pobres se enfrentaron a unionistas en el paro convocado por empresarios y cívicos
 A las armas cruceños. Ahora (Habla David Cejas,  dirigente de la UJC)
 Autonomia para los ricos, revolucion para los pobres 1
 Autonomia para los ricos, revolucion para los pobres 2
 Los unionistas piden asilo en la catedral de Santa Cruz

Fascism in South America
Neo-fascist organizations
Organisations based in Bolivia
Far-right politics in Bolivia
Racism in Bolivia
Santa Cruz de la Sierra